The 1972 FA Cup final took place on 6 May 1972 at Wembley Stadium. It was the centenary final (although only the 91st final due to the world wars) and the 44th to be played at Wembley.

It was contested between cup holders Arsenal, who had won the Football League and the FA Cup the previous season, and Leeds United, who had won the Inter-Cities Fairs Cup and finished second in the league the previous season, but had never won the FA Cup. Arsenal and Leeds became the first clubs to have faced one another in both English domestic cup finals: the two had previously contested the 1968 Football League Cup Final, which Leeds had won, 1–0. Arsenal planned to make it the third successive decade for a club to return as Cup-holders and win for a second successive year, as Newcastle United had done in 1952 and Tottenham Hotspur in 1962.

This final is the origin of the song "Leeds! Leeds! Leeds!" (commonly known as "Marching On Together"), which was the B-side of Leeds's Cup Final record. The song is still played by United and other Leeds sports teams.

Road to Wembley

Match summary
The Leeds duo Mick Jones and Allan 'Sniffer' Clarke combined to produce a goal in the fifty-third minute. Jones sent across a hard, shoulder-high centre and Clarke headed powerfully past Arsenal keeper Geoff Barnett's left hand from fifteen yards.

A match that often fell below the highest level began badly with a foul by Clarke on Alan Ball in the first five seconds and the first of four bookings – Bob McNab bringing down Peter Lorimer as early as the second minute. Neither side played consistently up to their capabilities, yet both had their moments.Charlie George's fierce volley cannoned back off the bar for Arsenal, and both Clarke and Lorimer struck the woodwork for Leeds.

Leeds' jubilation at the end was tempered by a last-minute injury to Mick Jones, who dislocated his elbow and had to be helped up the steps by Norman Hunter to receive his winners' medal.

Match facts

References

External links
Match Programme at fa-cupfinals.co.uk
Game facts at soccerbase.com
Full Results from the 1972 FA Cup competition at soccerbase.com
Match Report at Mighty Whites

Final
FA Cup Finals
FA Cup Final 1972
FA Cup Final 1972
FA Cup Final
FA Cup Final